Betsy Baker is an American actress, best known as playing Linda in the film The Evil Dead (1981).

Early life
Baker was born in Cedar Rapids, Iowa - a middle child - and grew up in St. Joseph, Michigan. She started piano lessons at the age of five and also took voice lessons and studied dance. She attended Michigan State University and graduated with a degree in theater education and classical voice.

After graduating, Baker embarked upon headline engagements throughout the south, including The Eden Roc in Miami Beach, Florida and other venues, with a group called Musicana. Betsy eventually found herself in Detroit, where she honed her craft in television, radio voice-overs and industrial films.

Career
Baker landed the role of Linda in the film The Evil Dead after she came to Sam Raimi's attention in Detroit.

After a lengthy hiatus, in which she focused on being a mother, Baker resumed her acting career in 2006. Her most recent movie is Lake Eerie released in 2016.

Filmography

Film

Television

Video games

References

External links

Exclusive Betsy Baker Interview at Deadites Online

American film actresses
Actors from Cedar Rapids, Iowa
Living people
21st-century American women
Year of birth missing (living people)